Ayvacık is a town in Çanakkale Province in the Marmara region of Turkey. It is the seat of Ayvacık District. Its population is 9,710 (2021). During the Gallipoli campaign in World War I, it was the target of several allied attacks.

References

External links
 Municipality's official website 
 Road map of Ayvacık and environs
 Various images of Akliman in Ayvacık, Çanakkale
 Various images of Küçükkuyu in Ayvacık, Çanakkale

Populated places in Çanakkale Province
Ayvacık District, Çanakkale
Towns in Turkey